Seroshtanov is a rural locality (a khutor) in Alexeyevsky District, Belgorod Oblast, Russia. The population was 7 as of 2010. There are 5 streets.

Geography 
Seroshtanov is located 12 km south of Alexeyevka (the district's administrative centre) by road. Orlov is the nearest rural locality.

References 

Rural localities in Alexeyevsky District, Belgorod Oblast